Elections for the 75th Oregon Legislative Assembly took place in 2008. The Republican and Democratic primary elections were on May 20, 2008, and the general election was held on November 4, 2008. Fifteen of the Oregon State Senate's thirty seats were up for election, as were all 60 seats of the Oregon House of Representatives.

In the general election, there were 39 races with both Democratic and Republican candidates; 24 were in districts previously represented by a Republican, 15 in districts previously represented by Democrats. Sixteen Democrats ran without a Republican opponent, and five Republicans ran without a Democratic opponent.

Eighteen incumbent House members and six incumbent Senators earned enough write-in votes in the opposing party's primary to earn a dual endorsement.

General election Senate candidates

Every two years, half of the state senate seats come up for election. In 2008 there was also an election for District 17, resulting from Senator Brad Avakian's appointment to Oregon Labor Commissioner. Thus, 16 seats were up for election.

Nine of the 16 Senate seats up for election were previously held by Democrats. Four of these races had both Democratic and Republican candidates in the general election. The other seven seats were previously held by Republicans, and four of them were contested by both major parties. Democrats lost one seat (District 27 in the Bend area) to the Republican Party, and went into 2009 with a majority of 18 seats to the Republicans' 12.

Except where footnoted, candidates were unopposed in their party's primary.

General election House candidates
Every two years, all of the state house seats come up for election. Democrats gained five seats from the previous session: two in open seats and three in defeating incumbent Republicans.

Except where footnoted, candidates were unopposed in their party's primary.

Citations and primary election notes

Legislative
2008